Giacomo Colonna or Jacopo Colonna may refer to:

Giacomo Colonna (cardinal) (died 1318), enemy of Pope Boniface VIII
Giacomo Sciarra Colonna (died 1329), nephew of the cardinal
 (died 1341), son of Stefano Colonna the Elder and nephew of Sciarra
Giacomo Colonna, person who found the Letter of Lentulus in 1421
Giacomo Colonna (died 1431), Neapolitan official, chamberlain of Joanna II of Naples
Jacopo Colonna (sculptor) (died 1540)